Pireneitega spasskyi is an araneomorph spider species found in Georgia and Azerbaijan.

References

External links 

Agelenidae
Spiders of Georgia (country)
Spiders of Asia
Fauna of Azerbaijan
Spiders described in 1946